Charles Friedrich Zimpel (December 11, 1801 - June 26, 1879) was a German architect who designed buildings in New Orleans, Louisiana, U.S. from 1830 to 1837; and later, in 1864, the plan for the Jaffa to Jerusalem railway line. In particular, he designed the Bishop's City Hotel in 1831, the Bank of Orleans in 1832, as well as the Banks Arcade and the Orleans Cotton Press in 1833.<https://www.lahistory.org/resources/dictionary-louisiana-biography/dictionary-louisiana-biography-z/ Charles F., surveyor, engineer, cartographer, architect. Probably came to New Orleans as the surveyor and engineer for the course of the New Orleans and Carrollton Railroad (now the St. Charles Avenue streetcar line); also spent the years 1831-1832 compiling surveys for the production of the map “Topographical Map of New Orleans and Its Vicinity . . . “, which he had engraved in Prussia, probably his native country. The map includes the first survey of the town of Carrollton (now the upper limits of New Orleans) done by Zimpel. In 1834, he is listed as deputy city surveyor and engineer. Zimpel was the architect for four New Orleans buildings, all designed and built in the 1830s: the Bank of Orleans, Banks Arcade, Bishop's City Hotel, and Orleans Cotton Press. He also remodeled the Charity Hospital building as the State House. Apparently left New Orleans by the late 1830s.

By 1864, he was in Constantinople, where as “Ingénieur en chef” he drew up plans for the proposed Jaffa to Jerusalem railway line.

J.A.M. Sources: Louisiana Courier, November 30, 1833, February 20, 1836; New Orleans Bee, February 20, 1836; Friends of the Cabildo, New Orleans Architecture, vol. II: The American Sector (1972); Benjamin Moore Norman, Norman's New Orleans and Environs; Benjamin Henry Latrobe, Impressions Respecting New Orleans, ed. by Samuel Wilson, Jr. (1951); John Smith Kendall, History of New Orleans, II (1922).

He created a map of Carrollton, New Orleans in 1832 and a map of New Orleans in 1834.

Constantinople source: PLAN d‘un chemin de fer de JAFFA A JERUSALEM par Dr. Chas. F. Zimpel, Ingénieur en chef, Constantinople, Octobr. 1864.

References

1801 births
1879 deaths
People from Szprotawa
19th-century German architects
German expatriates in the United States